The New Alliance was a political alliance in Benin.

History
The Alliance was formed prior to the 2003 elections as an alliance of the Democratic Party of Benin and the Union for Progress and Democracy. Part of the opposition coalition, the Alliance won two seats.

References

Defunct political party alliances in Benin